"The Pot" is a song by American rock band Tool and was released as a promotional single from their fourth studio album 10,000 Days (2006).

It became Tool's first number one song, topping the Billboard Mainstream Rock chart in 2007. It also received a Grammy nomination for Best Hard Rock Performance in 2008.

Background 
According to Adam Jones, it is confirmed to be about hypocrisy and is a double entendre that refers to both drug intoxication and believing oneself to be above others, deriving from the phrase "the pot calling the kettle black".

According to The Rock Radio, a music video was filmed during the holiday season in 2006; however, it never surfaced.

Track listing

Credits and personnel
Tool
Maynard James Keenan – vocals
Adam Jones – guitars
Danny Carey – drums
Justin Chancellor – bass

Production
Joe Barresi – engineering and mixing
Bob Ludwig – mastering

Chart performance

Certifications

References

External links
 Official lyrics for "The Pot" submitted by Keenan

2006 singles
Songs about cannabis
Protest songs
Tool (band) songs
2005 songs
Songs written by Maynard James Keenan
Songs written by Danny Carey
Songs written by Justin Chancellor
Songs written by Adam Jones (musician)